Bruxner is a surname. Notable people with the surname include:
 Michael Bruxner (1882–1970), Australian politician and soldier
 Tim Bruxner (born 1923), Australian politician

Locations
 Bruxner Highway, state highway in New South Wales, Australia

See also
 Berlyn Brixner (1911–2009), photographer